Herbert Bruce Alford Sr. (September 12, 1922 – May 8, 2010) was an American football end in the National Football League (NFL) for the New York Yanks. He also played football in the All-America Football Conference for the New York Yankees.  Alford played college football at Texas Christian University (TCU).  Alford was an all Southwest Conference end in 1941 and 1942 was named MVP in the 1942 Orange Bowl and received Rogers Trophy in 1942, awarded to the TCU Most Valuable Player. He served in World War II for the United States Army.

After retiring from playing, he was a line judge in the NFL for 20 seasons, from 1960 to 1979, working three Super Bowls (II, VII, IX), wearing number 24. His son, Bruce Alford Jr., also played in the NFL.

References

External links
 Obituary
 

1922 births
2010 deaths
American football ends
New York Yankees (AAFC) players
New York Yanks players
TCU Horned Frogs football players
National Football League officials
Sportspeople from Waco, Texas
Players of American football from Texas
Waco High School alumni
United States Army personnel of World War II